Ville Taulo (born 14 August 1985) is a Finnish former professional footballer who played as a midfielder.

Club career

He has played for both FC Lahti and HJK in Finnish Veikkausliiga. In January 2010 it was announced that he had signed a three-and-a-half-year deal with Italian club Taranto.

Just after one unsuccessful season – and only five first team appearances – Taulo was loaned to AC Bellinzona. In April 2012 Taulo was loaned to FC Lahti for three months.

Career statistics

International

References

External links
 
 
 Career Stars at Guardian Football
 Stats at Veikkausliiga.com
 A.S. Taranto Calcio

Finnish footballers
1985 births
Living people
Association football midfielders
Veikkausliiga players
FC Lahti players
Helsingin Jalkapalloklubi players
Taranto F.C. 1927 players
Alta IF players
Finnish expatriate footballers
Expatriate footballers in Norway
Finnish expatriate sportspeople in Norway
Finland international footballers
HIFK Fotboll players
Klubi 04 players
Sportspeople from Lahti